Zancleopsidae is a family of hydrozoans in the order Anthomedusae.

References

Capitata
Cnidarian families